Dominic Hassler (born March 30, 1981) was an Austrian football striker.

References
Guardian Football

1981 births
Living people
Austrian footballers
SK Sturm Graz players
LASK players
FC Red Bull Salzburg players
Grazer AK players
Austrian Football Bundesliga players
Association football forwards
People from Lienz
Footballers from Tyrol (state)